WBPWD is one of the prestigious departments under the control of Government of West Bengal. Under PWD, the Public Works and Public Works (Roads) Directorates are presently charged with the planning, survey, design, construction and maintenance of Roads, Bridges and Buildings throughout the state as well as having various responsibilities for emergency and relief activities.

PWD also provides infrastructural support for both original and repair works to all the departments directly under the Government of West Bengal as well as different semi-Government/Government Undertakings etc. Besides construction of buildings/structures, Bridges, Roads including national and state highways, PWD also carry out works related to electrification, sanitary plumbing, air-conditioning, fire-fighting & detection, lifts, water supply, Generators, EPABX, Information Technology etc. Therefore, one can imagine the huge task assigned to PWD engineers.

The Department is headed by the Minister-In-Charge. The Secretary takes care of the implementation of the policy decision & administration. The Engineer-in-Chief manages the execution of engineering matters. The Public Works Department has two segments-Secretariats and Directorates.

There are three directorates in the department namely Public Works Directorate, Public Works (Roads) Directorate and Public Works Construction Board Directorate.

The Public Works Directorate has three wings namely Civil Wing, Electrical Wing and Architectural Wing.

The Public Works (Roads) Directorate is further split into six CE Offices - Roads, National Highway, Durgapur Expressway, NH World Bank, RBRI and Planning & Quality Assurance.

The department is organised in the form of Head Office, Circle office, Division Office, Sub-Division Office and Block. The Chief Engineer heads a particular wing. The Superintending Engineer heads each of the Circle Offices while the Executive Engineers and the Assistant Engineers head the division and sub-division offices respectively.

The Department has a network of more than maintain 3300 km. of State Highway, 7300 km. of major District & ordinary District Roads and 5400 km of Rural Roads throughout West Bengal. In addition, the Department maintains 2000 km. of National Highways (as in 2009-2010).

The principal aim of PWD is to augment the economical activities of the whole state, create wealth through improvement in the transportation system and alleviate poverty through construction of various bridges, roads and public buildings along with extending support for improvement of transportation services. Apart from those the Department has to undertake some extended responsibilities in social area also. With the allotted sum, this department in the changed scenario is geared up to undertake any responsibility for the development and progress of the state through construction of roads, bridges and buildings.

History of Public Works (Pre Independence) 
In the early days of public works in British India, P.W.D. was responsible for construction and maintenance of building and roads and irrigation projects like canals, dams and reservoirs etc. The management of Public Works Department during this period was not at all systematic and was under the control of Military Board of Imperial Government. But the arrangement did not prove to be much effective. Drawing attention of the Government to the unsatisfactory management and state of affairs in public works, the Court of Directors of the East India Company, in early1850, instituted a Commission each of the presidencies for investigation. The order became effective in December, 1850 and the Bengal Commission submitted its report in March, 1851. The members of the Commission were unanimous on the inability of the Military Board in the management of the public works department. Lord Dalhousie founded the public works department through which works programme like construction of roads, bridges and other public utility works including extension of irrigation projects were undertaken.

The Commission submitted a new proposal for department management. The basic features of the proposal as accepted by the Court of Directors were as under:

The Control of P.W.D. was removed from under the Military Board and placed under the Chief Engineers.

P.W.D. came under the control of respective provincial Government.

The Chief Engineers to be assisted by the Superintending Engineer & Executive Engineer.

The independent officers of the Chief Engineers were dissolved.

The Governor General of India issued an order No. 430 of 1854 on 21st April, 1854 by which the responsibility for management and control of the Public Works Department was entrusted upon the Bengal Presidency with effect from 1st May, 1854:

In 1866, P.W.D. was divided into three branches namely, Civil (Roads, Building & Irrigation), Military and Railway. This very year the then Governor General, Lord Lawrence (1864-68) introduced the system of investing in public works by borrowing from the public. The New policy saw implementation of some important projects like Midnapore Canal (1872), Orissa Coast Canal (1882), Rajapur Drainage Canal (1882) etc. During 1870, local government system was introduced by the government. As per a government decision taken in May, 1882 during the tenure of Lord Ripon (1880-84), the local government body in India were recognized following the British Rules. In 1893, provincial services were created in each of the provinces of India. The technical branch staffs were divided into three categories: (i) Engineers (ii) Upper Subordinates (iii) Lower Subordinates. And the engineers were divided into separate services, viz., Imperial Services and Provincial Services. While the Engineers were recruited in England and reserved for the British people only in case of the former services, in case of the latter, appointments were available to the recognized community of the Indians only.

With the complete separation of the Military branch in 1895, the P.W.D. became an exclusive civil department. The P.W.D. became responsible for public works relating to roads, buildings, irrigations and railways from this time. Beside, with the integration and development of local government system, Special types of public works were entrusted upon District Boards and Municipalities.

In 1905, the railways branch was segregated from the P.W.D. and was converted into a separate department under the management and control of Railway Board. The first railway line in India was commissioned in 1853 from Bombay to Thane and train services were introduced. Till 1905 about 3600 miles of railway track was constructed by the P.W.D.

Increased initiative by the British Government for more development increased the work load of P.W.D. considerably. In 1920, P.W.D. was divided into two separate departments, viz., Public Works and Irrigation.

Surface Roads of pre-independence period were maintained by Works and Building Directorate, which subsequently nomenclatured as P.W. Directorate under the administrative set up of P.W. Department.

History of Public Works ( Post Independence) 
The necessity of developing the road system in West Bengal was keenly felt and gradually large number of district board roads were taken over by the State PWD for improvement and maintenance. Road construction under plan program was taken up in the year 1952 and for this purpose Road Development Directorate was created under the administrative set up of Development & Planning Department. In the early Five year Plan Periods the road constructed under plan program by the Roads Development Directorate was handed over to the P.W. Directorate for maintenance work. Subsequently with increased volume of road construction, Roads Development Directorate was separated from administrative set up of Development & Planning Department and renamed as P. W. (Roads) Directorate under administrative set up of P. W. (Roads) Department. Till today large number of State Highways and District Roads are being maintained by P.W. Directorate as well as P. W. (Roads) Directorate.

In 1950 Central Government identified some of the important and busy stretches of Inter-State road network as National Highways to be maintained by State P.W. Directorate under the fund provision of Ministry of Transport, presently renamed as Ministry of Road Transport and Highway under Government of India. Special Road Organization Wing was formed within P. W. (Roads) Directorate in early Sixties to look after the National Highway sectors along with other roads in the State. Coal Road Construction Circle was one of the important circles within Special Road Organization Wing for looking after National Highway No. 2 well known as Grand Trunk Road. In Seventies the Special Road Organization Wing was renamed as National Highway Wing specially to look after the National Highway Sector only and in Eighties all the National Highway within the State was handed over to the National Highway Wing for maintenance and further improvement.

Initial construction activities for the dream project of Durgapur Expressway was taken up by the Development Corporation but was stood over for the time being. In 1985-86 the project again picked up its position in the priority sector and was sanctioned as World Bank Project. A separate wing named as Durgapur Expressway Wing was created. After completion of the project the DEW Wing had been entrusted to look after another NH Project named as Belghoria Expressway.

In 1995 and 1998 two Project Implementation Units were formed within P. W. (Roads) Directorate to look after the projects of Four-Laning of National Highway No. 2 from Barrakar to Ranigunj with World Bank loan assistance and implementation of West Bengal State Road Project respectively.

Road and Building Research Institute was set up under P. W. (Roads) Directorate about fifty years back for in-service training to the departmental engineers, testing of quality of work and conducting research works in building and road sectors. In 2009, the Durgapur Expressway Wing of P. W. (Roads) Directorate was renamed as the wing of Special Project of P. W. (Roads) Directorate and it has been entrusted to implement and monitor the work of centrally sponsored projects / schemes related to infrastructural development of road, in the State, including roads of inter-state connectivity and any other special projects/schemes under CRF, ISC, PPP, SCA, BOT etc., as could be sanctioned by concerned project sanctioning authority under the sponsorship of the Government of India from time to time.

Now World Bank National Highway Wing of P. W. (Roads) Directorate has also been entrusted to look after the work of PMGSY to give a momentum to the schemes, which is primarily vested with P & R Department.

At present, the Public Works and Public Works (Roads) Department in West Bengal are presently charged with the planning, survey, design, construction and maintenance of Roads, Bridges and Buildings throughout the state as well as having various responsibilities for emergency and relief activities.

PWD Department with suitable co-ordination of the Civil, Electrical, Mechanical and Architectural Wings, carry out the task assigned related to economical activities of construction of various bridges, roads and public buildings along with extending support for improvement of transportation services, with the allotted sum the P.W. & the P. W. (Roads) Department construct new bridges in un-bridged portions for improvement of communication system, up-grade the present road transportation system, construct road over-bridges in place of Railway level crossing and also maintain and construct all public buildings. There are Electrical & Architectural Wing under the P.W. Department, there is a Mechanical Wing under the P. W. (Roads) Department. The P.W. (Construction Board) primarily construct and maintain building of other departments with funds provided by those departments. Overall, this department can undertake any responsibility for the progress of the state through construction of roads, bridges and buildings.

Ministerial Team 
The ministerial team is headed by the Cabinet Minister for Public Works, who may or may not be supported by Ministers of State. Civil servants are assigned to them to manage the ministers' office and ministry.

The current head of the ministry is Pulak Roy.

Functions of WBPWD 
Public Works Department is the nodal department of the State Government for creation of infrastructure. The Department is responsible for maintenance of about 17217 km road length throughout the State. Out of the roads maintained by PWD, (i) 1687 km are NH roads; (ii) 3612 km road length is categorised as State Highway; (iii) 9500 km of road is categorised as Major District Roads(MDR); and (iv) 2418 km is categorised as Rural Roads. To further improve the road infrastructure within the State, PWD is in the process of taking over important roads belonging to Zilla Parishads and Municipalities. It is expected that nearly 3000 km of additional road length would come to PWD for upgradation and maintenance. This would go a long way in further improving the road network within the State. In the last 6 years from May 2011,till August 2017, the department has constructed/upgraded 13324 km of roads and constructed 153 ROBs/bridges/culverts. Another 2980 km of roads and 87 ROBs/bridges/culverts are nearing completion.

PWD has a major role to play in boosting the economic activities within the State through improvement in transportation system. Opening of new and remote areas, through construction of roads/bridges,bring these areas closer to the consumption centre, thereby, ensuring that the farmers get remunerative prices for their products. A good road network also leads to higher productivity for the population it serves. 

The Department is also responsible for construction and maintenance of Government buildings belonging to different departments. In addition to roads, buildings and bridges; PWD also undertakes all typesof infrastructure projects relating to stadia, swimming pools, airports, auditoriums, helipads, bus terminus etc. 

At the apex level, the Department is headed by MIC, PWD. The Principal Secretary is the head of the Department and is responsible for policy matters and their implementation. Principal Secretary is assisted in his work by several Joint Secretaries and Financial Advisor of the Department. The Engineer-in-Chief is the topmost technical authority of the Department and is responsible for guiding the engineer officers in all technical matters. 

The Department has two directorates, viz. PW Directorate and PW Roads Directorate. Each of the directorates has its geographical units called Zones headedbya Chief Engineer. The entire State is divided into three Zones, viz. North Zone; South Zone; and West Zone.Below the Zones, there are Circles, which are headed by the Superintending Engineers and Divisions, which are headed by Executive Engineers. Under the Divisions, there are sub-divisions, which are headed by Assistant Engineers and further down sections, which are headed by Junior Engineers. 

Public Works Directorate is headed by Chief Engineer(HQ), who has Chief Engineer, Planning; Chief Engineer, Electrical; Chief Engineer, Electrical Planning; Chief Engineer, Social Sector; and Chief Government Architect to assist him. 

PWDirectorate has three wings, viz. civil wing; electrical wing; and architectural wing. PW Directorate is responsible for construction and maintenance of all buildings and building related projects. In addition, PW Directorateis also responsible for maintenance and upgradation of some roads in every district. Infrastructure for all VIP and VVIP visits of State headquarters/districts is created by PWD.

The PW(Roads) Dte. is headed by Chief Engineer(HQ) PW(Roads) Dte. and he is assisted in his work by Chief Engineer, Planning(Roads); Chief Engineer, NH; and Chief Engineer, R&BRI. This Directorate also has three wings, viz. Roads wing; NH wing; and Mechanical wing. 

The Department also has a well-established research-cum-training institute called the Roads & Building Research Institute(R&BRI) at Pailan on Diamond Harbour Road.This organisation is responsible for ensuring quality control in ongoing works; training of officers of different wings; and for research work. The Department proposes to further upgrade it and turn it into a major training institute of Eastern India. 

There are four PSUs under PWD, viz. West Bengal Highway Development Corporation Ltd(WBHDCL); Mackintosh Burn Ltd(MBL); Westinghouse Saxby Farmer Ltd.(WSFL); and Britannia Engineering Ltd.(BEL). 

 WBHDCL has been set up to undertake 4-laning works of State Highways and also for creation and construction of roads on PPP model. It has also completed several important projects and is in the process of undertaking some mega projects. 
 MBL is essentially a construction company,with expertise in building and bridge projects. They are undertaking huge quantum of work on buildings and bridges of the Department as well as of other Government departments/PSUs.
 WSFL and BEL are basically engineering companies, which are under process of restructuring.

Departmental Structure 
The Department has two directorates, viz. PW Directorate and PW Roads Directorate. Each of the directorates has its geographical units called Zones headed by a Chief Engineer. The entire State is divided into three Zones, viz. North Zone; South Zone; and West Zone.Below the Zones, there are Circles, which are headed by the Superintending Engineers and Divisions, which are headed by Executive Engineers. Under the Divisions, there are sub-divisions, which are headed by Assistant Engineers and further down sections, which are headed by Junior Engineers. Public Works Directorate is headed by Chief Engineer(HQ), who has Chief Engineer, Planning; Chief Engineer, Electrical; Chief Engineer, Electrical Planning; Chief Engineer, Social Sector; and Chief Government Architect to assist him. PWDirectorate has three wings, viz. civil wing; electrical wing; and architectural wing. PW Directorate is responsible for construction and maintenance of all buildings and building related projects. In addition, PW Directorateis also responsible for maintenance and upgradation of some roads in every district. Infrastructure for all VIP and VVIP visits of State headquarters/districts is created by PWD. The PW(Roads) Dte. is headed by Chief Engineer(HQ) PW(Roads) Dte. and he is assisted in his work by Chief Engineer, Planning(Roads); Chief Engineer, NH; and Chief Engineer, R&BRI. This Directorate also has three wings, viz. Roads wing; NH wing; and Mechanical wing. The Department also has a well-established research-cum-training institute called the  Roads & Building Research Institute (R&BRI) at Pailan on Diamond Harbour Road.This organisation is responsible for ensuring quality control in ongoing works; training of officers of different wings; and for research work. The Department proposes to further upgrade it and turn it into a major training institute of Eastern India. There are four PSUs under PWD, viz. West Bengal  Highway Development Corporation Ltd(WBHDCL);Mackintosh Burn Ltd(MBL); Westinghouse Saxby Farmer's Ltd. (WSFL); and Britannia Engineering Ltd.(BEL). WBHDCL has been set up to undertake 4-laning works of State Highways and also for creation and construction of roads on PPP model. It has also completed several important projects and is in the process of undertaking some mega projects. MBL is essentially a construction company,with expertise in building and bridge projects. They are undertaking huge quantum of work on buildings and bridges of the Department as well as of other Government departments/PSUs. WSFL and BEL are basically engineering companies, which are under process of restructuring.

Designations and career progression

Recruitment

A. West Bengal Senior Engineering Service 
(a) Engineer-in-Chief: The post of Engineer-in-Chief shall be filled up by selection from amongst

Chief Engineer with at least one year of residual service on the date of occurrence of vacancy:

Provided that a Selection Committee shall be made for selection to the post by order;

(b) Chief Engineer: The post of Chief Engineer shall be filled up by selection from amongst the

Superintending Engineer [including the posts which are designated as Superintending Engineer

Recruitment

(Selection Grade) and Assistant Chief Engineer] with at least one year of residual service on the

date of occurrence of vacancy:

Provided that a Selection Committee shall be made for selection to the post by order;

(c) Superintending Engineer: The posts of Superintending Engineer (including the posts which are

designated as Assistant Chief Engineer) shall be filled up by promotion from the rank of

Executive Engineer (including the posts which are designated as Technical Assistant to the

Superintending Engineer);

(d) I. Executive Engineer

(i) Subject to the provision of Sub-clause (ii), the posts of Executive Engineer (including the

posts which are designated as Technical Assistant to the Superintending Engineer), shall be filled

up by promotion from the rank of Assistant Engineer, provided that if sufficient number of

Assistant Engineers suitable for such promotion are not available at any time, the posts may be

filled up by direct recruitment.

II. Qualification for direct recruitment

(a) A degree in Civil Engineering from a recognised University or equivalent qualification.

(b) Six years’ experience in Civil Engineering

(c) Age — Not more than 38 years on 1st January of the year of advertisement.

Provided that the upper age may be relaxable for the candidate belonging to the categories of

Scheduled Caste, Scheduled Tribe and Other Backward Classes as per the Government Order for

the time being in force;

(ii) Notwithstanding anything contained in any other rule, an Assistant Engineer is eligible to be

considered for promotion to the rank of Executive Engineer after he has completed 6 years of

service as Assistant Engineer and has passed the Departmental and Professional Examinations

referred to respectively in Chapter V and VI of the Services (Training and Examination) Rules,

West Bengal, at any stage of his service subject to availability of vacancy;

B. West Bengal Engineering Service 
a) Assistant Engineer

Recruitment to the posts of Assistant Engineer shall be made as follows:—

(i) 60% of the posts of Assistant Engineer shall be filled up by direct recruitment through Public

Service Commission, West Bengal provided that the State Government may fill up in the

exigencies of the public service vacant posts of Assistant Engineer in the direct recruitment

quota.

(A) Scheme of examination

The examination shall consist of two parts-written and interview. Written part shall bear total

marks of 200 and that in the interview shall be 100.

(B) Syllabus for written examination

This shall be decided by the West Bengal Public Service Commission in consultation with the

department.

(ii) The remaining 40% of the posts of Assistant Engineer shall be filled up by promotion from

amongst the confirmed Junior Engineers(Civil) by selection through the Public Service

Commission subject to the provision of sub-clause(iv) of clause (e); provided that if on any

occasion suitable departmental candidates for promotion are not available, the State may in its

discretion fill up the posts in the promotion quota by direct recruitment through the Public

Service Commission in the manner stated in sub-clause (i).

(iii) Qualification for direct recruitment to the post of Assistant Engineer shall be as follows :—

(a) Essential – A degree in Civil Engineering of a recognised University or equivalent qualifications.

(b) Age – Not more than 32 years on the 1st day of January of the year of advertisement;

provided that the upper age may be relaxed for the candidate belonging to the categories of

Schedule Caste, Schedule Tribes and other Backward Classes as per Government order for the

time being in force.”

(iv) In order to be eligible for promotion to the rank of Assistant Engineer a Junior Engineer(Civil)

must fulfil the following conditions –

(a) he must render a minimum of 10 (ten) years’ continuous service as a Junior Engineer (Civil) in

the regular establishment under Public Works Department;

(b) he must be confirmed in the post of Junior Engineers (Civil); and

(c) he must pass an examination to be conducted by the Public Service Commission, West

Bengal which will be of the same standard as the Professional Examination referred to in Chapter

VI of the Service (Training and Examination) Rules, West Bengal, provided that a Junior Engineer

(Civil) who has rendered a minimum of 8 (eight) years service including temporary service in a post

of Junior Engineers (Civil) in the regular establishment shall be eligible for appearing at the said

examination.

C. West Bengal Subordinate Engineering Service 
Recruitment to the post of Junior Engineer (Civil) shall be in accordance with the rules regulating

the recruitment to the cadres of the West Bengal Sub-ordinate Service of Engineers (Civil), the

West Bengal Sub-ordinate Service of Engineers (Mechanical), the West Bengal Sub-ordinate

Service of Engineers (Electrical) and the posts of Junior Engineers (Civil/Mechanical/Electrical)

under various Departments, Directorates, other offices and establishments vide Notification No.

7551 -F(P) dated 16th October, 2015 of Finance Department, Government of West Bengal for

recruitment to the cadres of the West Bengal Sub-ordinate Service of Engineers .

Inspection Bungalow/ Rest Shed under W.B.P.W.D.

References 

Government buildings in West Bengal
Government departments of West Bengal